The 1905 Michigan State Normal Normalites football team represented Michigan State Normal College (later renamed Eastern Michigan University) during the 1905 college football season.  In their second and final season under head coach Daniel H. Lawrence, the Normalites compiled a record of 4–4 and were outscored by their opponents by a combined total of 157 to 81. The team lost to Olivet College by a 69 to 0 score. William N. Braley was the team captain.

Schedule

References

Michigan State Normal
Eastern Michigan Eagles football seasons
Michigan State Normal Normalites football